Bernard "Barney" Bircham (31 August 1924 – 11 October 2007) was an English footballer who played as a goalkeeper in the Football League for Grimsby Town and Colchester United.

Career

Born in Philadelphia, Bircham began his career with Sunderland, where he failed to break into the first team, and moved on to Chesterfield, where he also failed to make an appearance.

In 1949, Bircham joined Grimsby Town, where he would make eight appearances, before joining Colchester United for a fee of £800. He made his debut in a 2–1 home victory over Northampton Town on 17 February 1951. He made seven league appearances for Colchester, his final appearance coming in a 3–0 away defeat to rivals Ipswich Town on 24 March 1951.

Barney Bircham died in Grimsby on 11 October 2007. He had two children, Geoffrey and Susan, and left behind wife Betty.

References

1924 births
2007 deaths
Footballers from Tyne and Wear
English footballers
Association football goalkeepers
Sunderland A.F.C. players
Chesterfield F.C. players
Grimsby Town F.C. players
Colchester United F.C. players
English Football League players